Peter Spencer Dawes (5 February 1928 – 10 November 2022) was the fifth Church of England Bishop of Derby from 1988 to 1995.

Dawes was educated at Aldenham School and Hatfield College, Durham, and ordained in 1955. His career began with curacies at St Andrew's, Whitehall Park and St Ebbe's, Oxford. Then he was a Tutor at Clifton Theological College, Vicar of the Good Shepherd, Romford, and finally (before his elevation to the episcopate) Archdeacon of West Ham. After his retirement he became an honorary assistant bishop in the Diocese of Ely.

Dawes died on 10 November 2022, at the age of 94.

References

1928 births
2022 deaths
20th-century Church of England bishops
Alumni of Hatfield College, Durham
Archdeacons of West Ham
Bishops of Derby
People educated at Aldenham School